Attorney General McGrath may refer to:

J. Howard McGrath (1903–1966), Attorney General of the United States
Mike McGrath (born 1947), Attorney General of Montana